KBEA-FM (99.7 MHz, "B100") is a radio station in Davenport, Iowa, serving the Quad Cities, that is licensed to Muscatine, whose format is Top 40 (CHR). The station broadcasts at a power of 100 kW, from a transmitter located near Wilton, Iowa. The signal can be received in both the Cedar Rapids and Iowa City areas.

KBEA-FM is owned by Townsquare Media, with studios located in Davenport, Iowa (along with the co-located KJOC, WXLP, KIIK-FM and KBOB).

Frequency history

KWPC-FM (1949-late 1960s) and KFMH-FM (late 1960s–1973) 
The Muscatine allocation for 99.7 MHz dates to February 1949, when the station signed on as KWPC-FM, a sister station to KWPC (860 AM). The studios for both stations were located on the outskirts of Muscatine.

Early in its history, KWPC-FM—like most FM stations of the 1950s and 1960s—played beautiful, easy listening music. In the late 1960s, the station's call letters changed to KFMH, but easy listening music continued on the frequency for several more years.

KFMH-FM (1973-1994) 
In June 1973, KFMH underwent a major format change as Captain Steve Bridges (who had worked at KSTT in Davenport) came in as program director (he later became a part-owner); the station began playing alternative rock, which had gained widespread popularity on the west coast. KFMH ("99 Plus" and "The Real FM" was how it was commonly known) soon gained a devoted, fiercely loyal audience, as the station played lesser-known and local artists in a variety of genres—rock, jazz, blues, and other genres. Plus, KFMH's disc jockeys Andy Hammer, Kerry Peace, Lisa Catalona, Beth McBride, Chris Carson, Borderline Bob, and later Sean Tracy, Phil and Tom Maicke, Mary of the Heartland, Bob Just Bob, Dirty Judy, Jim Hunter, Roberto Nache, John Obvious, and Captain Steve played album cuts from popular artists. The station was known for pushing the envelope at times, but it also would change programming at a moment's notice (such as when word spread about the shooting death of John Lennon in 1980).

In 1981, John Flambo became the new owner and immediately removed the one-and-a-half-hour farm report morning show and replaced it with Andy Hammer and a format matching the rest of the day.  "The Plus" then made greater efforts to separate themselves from the rest of the radio dial with Kerry Peace hosting “Off the Beat n’ Track” presenting alternative and punk rock not heard anywhere else.

The 1980s ended with many changes to the station; during this time, Kerry Peace left to become a record rep for blues label Alligator. In March 1990, KFMH began transmitting from its current 1,000-foot tower in Wilton, Iowa with 100,000 watts.

In 1993, KFMH moved to Davenport, where it continued its alternative format for a year. It signed off at 3 p.m. on March 1, 1994 with the song "Your Move...I've Seen All Good People" by Yes, the song it signed on with on June 4, 1973. On the night it signed off, about 500 showed up outside the station to protest, but the station was locked up.

Mercury Broadcasting's WKBF inquired about moving the format to its frequency at 1270 AM, but the proposal never materialized.

In 2013, 19 years to the hour KFMH went off the air, "99 Plus KFMH" returned as an Internet-only station, with the original deejays Captain Steve, Tom Maicke, Jim Hunter, Roberto, and Mary of the Heartland. New deejays include Tommy Lang, Bill Klutho, and Patrick O'Leary. You can listen once again to Rock, Blues, Jazz, Reggae, and Alternative 24/7. 99pluskfmh.com is available on the TuneIn app, Simple Radio by Streema, and Sonos.

KBOB-FM (1994–2000)
On March 16, 1994, the 99.7 MHz frequency was sold to New York-based Connoisseur Communications, which changed the call letters to KBOB and its format to country (as a competitor to the Quad Cities-market's WLLR-FM). These changes outraged many loyal KFMH listeners, who feared there would no longer be a radio outlet for "alternative" music (in lieu of stations programmed by consultants); speculation that the format would move to 1270 AM never materialized. More than a decade after KFMH's demise, some fans still sorely miss the station's eclectic blend of music and programming.  Steve Bridges eventually moved to Iowa City where he purchased KCJJ, a 10,000-watt station with a talk-music hybrid that reaches much of eastern Iowa; like KFMH, "The Mighty 1630" does at times push the envelope.

KBOB, meanwhile, debuted to promising ratings. Part of what set the new station apart was inclusion of songs WLLR had since removed from its playlist. However, KBOB — which later was sold to Cumulus Media — soon languished behind the powerhouse stations in the Quad Cities market, especially WLLR, despite having the advantage of broadcasting at 100 kW; until March 1998, WLLR broadcast on a frequency whose power was 50 kW.

KBEA-FM "B100" (2000–present) 
On April 5, 2000, KBOB moved to 104.9 MHz, usurping that frequency's adult contemporary format. 99.7 MHz then adopted its current Top 40 format and "B100" branding; Robb Rose was the first program director. The station's first line-up included Rose and Julia Bradley in the morning, Jeff James in middays, Steve Fuller in the afternoon drive-time, Brandon Marshall in the evening and Rachel in overnights.

The station quickly gained a following, cutting into the ratings of the Quad-Cities market's dominant Top 40 station, "All-Hit 98.9" (WHTS-FM). In early 2006, WHTS was sold to the Educational Media Foundation, and along with new call letters, that station's format was changed to contemporary Christian, leaving "B100" as the only Top 40 station in the Quad Cities for the next six years. However, on February 20, 2012, Clear Channel launched a CHR format on KUUL-FM as "101.3 KISS FM."

On August 30, 2013, a deal was announced in which Townsquare Media would acquire 53 Cumulus stations, including KBEA-FM, for $238 million. The deal is part of Cumulus' acquisition of Dial Global; Townsquare and Dial Global are both controlled by Oaktree Capital Management. The sale to Townsquare was completed on November 14, 2013.

References

External links 
B100 website

Radio stations in the Quad Cities
Radio stations established in 1949
Contemporary hit radio stations in the United States
1949 establishments in Iowa
Townsquare Media radio stations